Stefano Della Santa (born 22 May 1967) is an Italian former road bicycle racer.

Achievements

1993
1st, Giro di Campania
1st, Trofeo Melinda
1994
1st, Overall, Bicicleta Vasca
1st, Overall, Vuelta a Andalucía
1st, Stages 4 & 5b
1st, Overall, Setmana Catalana de Ciclisme
1st, Stage 3
1995
1st, Overall, Vuelta a Andalucía
2000
1st, Stage 3, Grand Prix Cycliste de Beauce

External links

Achievements by cyclingbase.com 

1967 births
Italian male cyclists
Living people
Sportspeople from Lucca
Cyclists from Tuscany